Ali Radjel Cheikh Bachir (born 18 January 1998) is an Algerian professional footballer who plays as a left winger for Spanish club Cristo Atlético.

Club career
Radjel was born in the Western Sahara, to a Sahrawi mother and a Mauritanian father, and moved to Spain with his family at the age of nine. In July 2016, he moved to Rayo Vallecano's youth setup after representing UB Conquense.

In 2017, after finishing his formation, Radjel moved to Lithuania and joined a host of Spaniards at FK Utenis Utena. After appearing with the B-team in the I Lyga, he made his first team – and A Lyga – debut on 10 August of that year, coming on as a half-time substitute in a 1–1 home draw against FC Stumbras; he scored his first goal on 22 October, in a 3–0 away success over the same club.

On 4 November 2017, Radjel scored a brace in a 2–2 draw at FK Atlantas, and finished the season with four goals in 14 appearances. The following February, he returned to Spain and signed for Tercera División side Atlético Monzón.

In July 2018, after featuring regularly, Radjel moved to UD Logroñés, being initially assigned to the reserves also in the fourth division. He made his first team debut on 2 December, playing the last three minutes in a 1–1 Segunda División B home draw against Real Sociedad B.

In June 2019, after scoring a career-best 20 goals for Logroñés' B-side, Radjel moved to another reserve team, CD Numancia B still in the fourth tier. On 18 June of the following year, he made his first team debut by replacing Erik Morán late into a 1–2 home loss against Cádiz CF in the Segunda División championship. He made two more appearances at the end of that season as the club suffered relegation, but his involvement did not increase in the 2020-21 Segunda División B campaign, only taking the field once as a late substitute and again being utilised mainly by Numancia B.

After a season back with UD Logroñés, appearing exclusively for their reserves in the new fourth tier – the Segunda Federación – he signed for CD Palencia Cristo Atlético, of the same level, in June 2022.

References

External links
 
 
 

1998 births
Living people
Algerian people of Mauritanian descent
Algerian footballers
Association football wingers
Segunda División players
Segunda División B players
Tercera División players
Segunda Federación players
UD Logroñés B players
UD Logroñés players
CD Numancia B players
CD Numancia players
A Lyga players
FK Utenis Utena players
Algerian expatriate footballers
Algerian expatriate sportspeople in Spain
Algerian expatriate sportspeople in Lithuania
Sahrawi expatriates in Spain
Expatriate footballers in Spain
Expatriate footballers in Lithuania
21st-century Algerian people
Sahrawi sportsmen